Jerome Patrick (June 2, 1883 – September 26, 1923) was a New Zealand born American stage and film actor. Born Alexander Patrick, he worked as a dentist while acting locally and in Australia, where in 1912 he married Ethel Joan Meynelle, the daughter of a prominent Australian theatrical manager. He then moved to the US in 1914 and also spent time in Toronto, where he signed up for the Canadian Expeditionary Force during World War One (noting he had previously served four years with the New Zealand Hussars. He was discharged after 'several' nervous breakdowns, the doctor noting a previous heroin addiction and unstable nervous system, although completely abstaining from alcohol. 

He made more of a name for himself on the Broadway stage before coming to films rather late at 36 in 1919. He appeared in 10 films between 1919 and 1924.

He was born in New Zealand and died in New York, New York of 'nervous disorders'. His spouse was named Grey Brunelle.

Filmography 
 Three Men and a Girl (1919)
 Officer 666 (1920)
 The Furnace (1920)
 Her First Elopement (1921)
The Other Woman (1921)
 The Heart Line (1921)
 Don't Call Me Little Girl (1921)
 Forever (1921)
 School Days (1921)
 Sinners in Silk (1924)

References

External links 

 
 
 From left to right: Richard Barthelmess, Percy Marmont, Marguerite Clark and Jerome Patrick from Three Men and a Girl(1919) held in the University of Washington, Sayre collection

1883 births
1923 deaths
American male film actors
New Zealand male silent film actors
American male silent film actors
New_Zealand_male_film_actors
20th-century American male actors
New Zealand emigrants to the United States